Žirje can refer to:

 Žirje, Croatia, an island and settlement in the Adriatic Sea in Croatia
 Žirje, Slovenia, a village in the Sežana municipality in Slovenia